Toronto South, also known as South Toronto, was a provincial riding that was created in Toronto, Ontario in 1894. In 1886, Toronto was represented as one entire riding that elected three members. In 1894 this riding was split into four parts of which Toronto South was one. It occupied the southern part of the old city of Toronto. From 1908 to 1914 it elected two members to the legislature. In 1914 the riding was abolished and reformed into two new ridings called Toronto Southeast and Toronto Southwest.

Boundaries
The riding was established in 1894. The boundaries were College Street and Carlton Street to the north, Sherbourne Street to the east and Palmerston Avenue to the west. It was bounded on the south by Lake Ontario.

In 1914, the riding was split between the new ridings of Toronto Southeast and Toronto Southwest.

Members of Provincial Parliament

Election results

Seat A

Seat B

References

Notes

Citations

Former provincial electoral districts of Ontario
Provincial electoral districts of Toronto